Locomotive Springs Wildlife Management Area is a protected area in Utah, United States.

References 

Protected areas of Utah